The 2005–06 UCF Golden Knights men's basketball team was an NCAA Division I college basketball team that represented the University of Central Florida and competed in Conference USA. They played their home games at the UCF Arena in Orlando, Florida, and were led by head coach Kirk Speraw who was in his 13th season with the team. In the previous year, the Golden Knights finished the season 24–9, 13–7 in A-Sun play.

The 2005–06 season marked the first year that UCF played as members of Conference USA. From 1992–2005, the Golden Knights were members of the Atlantic Sun Conference, making four appearances in the NCAA tournament during that time.

Roster

Schedule and results

|-
!colspan=8| Exhibition

|-
!colspan=8| Regular season (Non-conference play)
|-

|-
!colspan=8| Regular season (C-USA conference play)
|-

|-
!colspan=8| C-USA tournament
|-

|-
| colspan="8" | *Non-Conference Game. Rankings from AP poll. All times are in Eastern Time.
|}

References

UCF Knights men's basketball seasons
UCF
UCF Knights
UCF Knights